Sarhad Paar is a 2006 Indian Hindi-language action drama film directed by Raman Kumar and produced by Goldie Tucker. The film stars Sanjay Dutt, Tabu, and Mahima Chaudhry as main characters, with Rahul Dev portraying the main villain.  The script was co-written by veteran actor Akash Khurana, who also plays a pivotal supporting character in the film.

Story
This story is about Ranjit Singh (Sanjay Dutt) who is a major in the Indian Army. One day Bakhtawar and his men attack the Indian Army. Ranjit Singh and some army men cross the Indian border to kill them. But in a blast all of them are killed but Ranjit is saved. Ranjit is tortured to reveal classified information, but he does not succumb, In the process Ranjit loses his memory. After that 'Bade Miya' (Father of Bakhtawar) saves Ranjit. When Ranjit come out of his illness he decides to send Ranjit back to India. But on the other side, in Ranjit's home, Pummy (Tabu), Simran (Mahima Chaudhry) and his father wait for Ranjit. The Panchayat wants to erect a statue in honour of his death, but Pummy wants to avoid this. Pummy obtains information that Pakistan would be releasing some Indian soldiers. They also release Ranjit, but because of his loss of memory, he is unable to find his way home. The Indian army puts Ranjit in hospital. Everyday Ranjit's wife Pummy and his sister Simran go to the hospital. Pummy tries to remind him of their own story. It is learnt that Ranjit meets Pummy at the engagement of a friend Ravi (Chandra Chur Singh) and falls in love with her, but her uncle and aunty get her engaged to a bad man. Pummy escaped from him and went to Ranjit's home. He asks her to marry him but Billa kidnaps Pummy and then Ranjit cuts Billa's hand. After the end of the story, on the second day Simran comes with a rakhee to tie on Ranjit. She requests the captain to give permission for them to go to the Gurudwara. However, Bakhtawar plants bombs everywhere, to spread crime, Ranjit knows Bakhtawar and he goes to catch Bakhtawar. Both fight with each other but Ravi shoots Ranjit's leg and Bakhtawar manages to escape. Ranjit's lost memory comes back. To catch Bakhtawar Ranjit decide to get Simran and Ravi married. Bakhtawar comes to kill Ranjit but fails. In the midst of all of this, Inspector Suraj dies. Ranjit arrests Bakhtawar. However, when an aeroplane is hijacked, the Indian army decide to release Bakhtawar in return for the hostages. Ravi, Bakhtawar & his friends come to border. Will Bakhtawar die? What will happen to Ravi? Can Ravi & Simran live happy life

Cast
Sanjay Dutt as Major Ranjit Singh, (The Sikh Regiment)
Tabu as Pammi
Mahima Chaudhry as Simran Chaddha
Chandrachur Singh as Ravi Brar
Anjana Mumtaz as Ravi's mother
Rahul Dev as Bakhtawar
Rana Jang Bahadur as Terrorist
Akash Khurana as Bade Miyan
Pankaj Dheer as Inspector Suraj Brar, Ravi's Brother
Sheela Sharma as Pankaj Dheer's Wife
Raza Murad as Major General Ashwini Kumar
Avtar Gill as Lt. Col. Kulwant Singh, OC, (The Sikh Regiment)
Rakesh Bedi as Dhola Singh
Satyen Kappu as taya
Ram Mohan as Sarpanch
Vishwajeet Pradhan as Captain Hanif Bilal, (The Sikh Regiment)
Anang Desai as R.K. Gupta, Home Secretary
Gopi Bhalla
Fakhar-e-Alam as Major Javaid (Pakistan Army)

Music
The music of the film is composed by Anand Raj Anand and lyrics are penned by Dev Kohli.

References

External links

2000s Hindi-language films
2007 films
Films scored by Anand Raj Anand
India–Pakistan relations in popular culture